The Protein Data Bank (PDB) file format is a textual file format describing the three-dimensional structures of molecules held in the Protein Data Bank. The PDB format accordingly provides for description and annotation of protein and nucleic acid structures including atomic coordinates, secondary structure assignments, as well as atomic connectivity. In addition experimental metadata are stored. The PDB format is the legacy file format for the Protein Data Bank which now keeps data on biological macromolecules in the newer mmCIF file format.

History
The PDB file format was invented in 1976 as a human-readable file that would allow researchers to exchange protein coordinates through a database system. Its fixed-column width format is limited to 80 columns, which was based on the width of the computer punch cards that were previously used to exchange the coordinates. Through the years the file format has undergone many changes and revisions. , the most recent revision is 3.30.

Example
A typical PDB file describing a protein consists of hundreds to thousands of lines like the following (taken from a file describing the structure of a synthetic collagen-like peptide):

HEADER    EXTRACELLULAR MATRIX                    22-JAN-98   1A3I
TITLE     X-RAY CRYSTALLOGRAPHIC DETERMINATION OF A COLLAGEN-LIKE
TITLE    2 PEPTIDE WITH THE REPEATING SEQUENCE (PRO-PRO-GLY)
...
EXPDTA    X-RAY DIFFRACTION
AUTHOR    R.Z.KRAMER,L.VITAGLIANO,J.BELLA,R.BERISIO,L.MAZZARELLA,
AUTHOR   2 B.BRODSKY,A.ZAGARI,H.M.BERMAN
...
REMARK 350 BIOMOLECULE: 1
REMARK 350 APPLY THE FOLLOWING TO CHAINS: A, B, C
REMARK 350   BIOMT1   1  1.000000  0.000000  0.000000        0.00000
REMARK 350   BIOMT2   1  0.000000  1.000000  0.000000        0.00000
...
SEQRES   1 A    9  PRO PRO GLY PRO PRO GLY PRO PRO GLY
SEQRES   1 B    6  PRO PRO GLY PRO PRO GLY
SEQRES   1 C    6  PRO PRO GLY PRO PRO GLY
...
ATOM      1  N   PRO A   1       8.316  21.206  21.530  1.00 17.44           N
ATOM      2  CA  PRO A   1       7.608  20.729  20.336  1.00 17.44           C
ATOM      3  C   PRO A   1       8.487  20.707  19.092  1.00 17.44           C
ATOM      4  O   PRO A   1       9.466  21.457  19.005  1.00 17.44           O
ATOM      5  CB  PRO A   1       6.460  21.723  20.211  1.00 22.26           C
...
HETATM  130  C   ACY   401       3.682  22.541  11.236  1.00 21.19           C
HETATM  131  O   ACY   401       2.807  23.097  10.553  1.00 21.19           O
HETATM  132  OXT ACY   401       4.306  23.101  12.291  1.00 21.19           O
...

HEADER, TITLE and AUTHOR records  provide information about the researchers who defined the structure; numerous other types of records are available to provide other types of information.
REMARK records  can contain free-form annotation, but they also accommodate standardized information; for example, the REMARK 350  BIOMT records describe how to compute the coordinates of the experimentally observed multimer from those of the explicitly specified ones of a single repeating unit.
SEQRES records  give the sequences of the three peptide chains (named A, B and C), which are very short in this example but usually span multiple lines.
ATOM records  describe the coordinates of the atoms that are part of the protein. For example, the first ATOM line above describes the alpha-N atom of the first residue of peptide chain A, which is a proline residue; the first three floating point numbers are its x, y and z coordinates and are in units of Ångströms. The next three columns are the occupancy, temperature factor, and the element name, respectively.
HETATM records  describe coordinates of hetero-atoms, that is those atoms which are not part of the protein molecule.

Molecular visualization software capable of displaying PDB files

3d Animation software capable of displaying PDB files

See also
 Chemical file format
 ScientificPython — provides an interface for Python
 Software for molecular mechanics modeling

References

External links
 PDB Format Guide This is the current version (3.3) of the PDB format specification.
 PDBML A more recent, alternative XML-based file format for molecular coordinates.
 The RCSB Protein Data Bank
 Protein Data Bank in Europe
 The Molecular Modeling DataBase (MMDB) from NCBI
 The wwPDB remediation Project from wwPDB
 MakeMultimer An online tool for expanding BIOMT records in PDB files
 Molecules iPad/iPhone App to display PDB files
 Python Macromolecular Library (mmLib) — a Python library capable of reading and writing PDB file formats

Computational chemistry
Chemical file formats
Biological databases